James Henry Griffin is an Australian politician. Griffin has served as the New South Wales Minister for Environment and Heritage in the Perrottet ministry since December 2021. He is a member of the New South Wales Legislative Assembly representing the electoral district of Manly for the Liberal Party. Griffin was elected on 8 April 2017 at the Manly state by-election held to replace the previous member, former Premier of New South Wales Mike Baird. 

He has previously served as the NSW Parliamentary Secretary for Veterans, the NSW Parliamentary Secretary for Health, and previously served as the NSW Parliamentary Secretary for the Environment.

Background 
Griffin went to school at St Mary's Cathedral College, and in 2006 was one of the first students to enrol at the Sydney campus of the University of Notre Dame Australia, from which he graduated with a Bachelor of Arts in 2008.

Griffin was also involved in local government, serving a single term as a councillor on Manly Council, and as deputy mayor under Mayor Jean Hay from 2015 to 2016 when the council was amalgamated into the Northern Beaches Council. His mother, Cathy Griffin, was a major in the Australian Army, and also served one term as a councillor in Manly, albeit as a member of the NSW Greens.

He is the son of Australian Army Officer Brigadier Michael Griffin AM (Ret) who was the Australian Commissioner for Law Enforcement Integrity.

Griffin was appointed as an Adjunct Lecturer in the School of Business at the University of Notre Dame, Sydney. He has also served as a board member of the University of Sydney Innovation Hub. Griffin co-founded SR7, a digital risk consulting company, in 2009. In February 2014, SR7 was acquired by professional service group KPMG, with Griffin joining the firm as a Director in the Risk Consulting Practice.

Political career 
Identified as a rising star in the NSW Parliamentary Liberal Party, Griffin was appointed a Member of the Legislation Review Committee in June 2017, and subsequently appointed Chair of the same committee in November 2017. The Legislation Review Committee reviews all Bills introduced into Parliament and reports on the impact of these Bills on personal rights and liberties.

In September 2018 Griffin was elected Chairman of the NSW Parliamentary Committee on Environment and Planning. The Committee tabled the Land Release and Housing Supply in NSW report in October 2018.

References

 

Year of birth missing (living people)
Living people
Members of the New South Wales Legislative Assembly
Liberal Party of Australia members of the Parliament of New South Wales
KPMG people
University of Notre Dame Australia alumni
New South Wales local councillors
Deputy mayors of places in Australia
21st-century Australian politicians